Pinto Canyon is a 1940 American Western film directed by Raymond K. Johnson and written by Carl Krusada. The film stars Bob Steele, Louise Stanley, Kenne Duncan, Ted Adams, Steve Clark and Budd Buster. The film was released on May 1, 1940, by Monogram Pictures.

Plot

Cast          
Bob Steele as Bob Hall
Louise Stanley as Helen Jones
Kenne Duncan as Fred Jones 
Ted Adams as Jim Farley
Steve Clark as Hardy Kellar
Budd Buster as Bill Kellar
Murdock MacQuarrie as Elmer Barnes
George Chesebro as Pete Childers
Carl Mathews as Clem
Jimmy Aubrey as George

References

External links
 

1940 films
American Western (genre) films
1940 Western (genre) films
Monogram Pictures films
American black-and-white films
Films directed by Raymond K. Johnson
1940s English-language films
1940s American films